was a Japanese meteorologist who became the namesake for the Fujiwhara effect. Novelist Jirō Nitta is his nephew and mathematician Masahiko Fujiwara is his grandnephew.

Biography

Early life
Born in the city of Suwa, Nagano Prefecture, Fujiwhara received his primary education at Takashima Common Elementary School and Suwa Higher Elementary School, where he was in the same class as future army general, Tetsuzan Nagata. He was also close friends with Shigeo Iwanami, who would go on to found the Iwanami Shoten Publishing company. He joined the Central Meteorological Observatory (current Japan Meteorological Agency) in 1909 after completing undergraduate studies in theoretical physics at Tokyo Imperial University (now the University of Tokyo).

Academic career
Fujiwhara earned his doctorate in 1915 through his research work on the abnormal propagation of sound waves, and earned the Japan Academy Prize in 1920 in recognition of his research. He traveled to Norway in the same year to study meteorology under Vilhelm Bjerknes.

He joined the Central Institution for the Training of Meteorologists (current Meteorological College of Japan) as general director after returning to Japan in 1922. He started his tenure as a professor at Tokyo Imperial University in 1924, and succeeded Takematsu Okada as the fifth director of the Japan Meteorological Agency in 1941.

Later life
Fujiwhara participated in the development of the fire balloon during the Pacific War, and was purged from his position after the conclusion of the war. He retreated to the countryside afterwards to concentrate on his writing, and devoted his efforts to educating the future generation of meteorologists and researching meteorological phenomena such as vortices, clouds and atmospheric optics. He also spearheaded the study of gliders in Japan, and became a member of the Japan Academy in 1937.

Texts
 , Iwanami Shoten Publishing, 1926
 , Iwanami Shoten Publishing, 1929
 , 1932
 , 1932
 , 1933
 , Iwanami Shoten Publishing, 1935
 , Iwanami Shoten Publishing, 1935
 , 1939
 , Iwanami Shoten Publishing, 1942
 , 1947
 , Sanseido, 1948
 , 1948
 , Iwanami Shoten Publishing, 1949
 , 1950
 , Iwanami Shoten Publishing, 1951
 , Sanseido, 1955
 , Iwanami Shoten Publishing
 , Iwanami Shoten Publishing
 , Iwanami Shoten Publishing

Notes

References

External links

 Biography from Ninohe city civic center website

1884 births
1950 deaths
People from Nagano Prefecture
Japanese meteorologists